Van Zandt County Courthouse is a historic courthouse in Canton, Texas. It is listed on the National Register of Historic Places.

History
There have been six courthouses serving Van Zandt County. The first courthouse, in Jordan's Saline, was constructed in 1848 in a Greek Revival style. The second courthouse, constructed in 1850, was a log cabin in Canton. The third courthouse was a brick structure built in 1859, also in Canton. The fourth courthouse was a two-story structure built in 1873 in Canton. The fifth courthouse was a brick building constructed in a Richardsonian Romanesque style in 1896 in Canton. It was razed to make room for a new courthouse in 1925.

The sixth and current Van Zandt County Courthouse was built from 1936 to 1937 using special county funds and a grant from the federal Public Works Administration. The building was designed by Voelcker & Dixon in an Art Deco style.

The building was listed on the National Register of Historic Places in 2017.

References

External links

National Register of Historic Places in Van Zandt County, Texas
County courthouses in Texas
Courthouses on the National Register of Historic Places in Texas
Buildings and structures completed in 1937